Georgina Public Library is a library system with locations in Keswick, Sutton and Pefferlaw Ontario, Canada. It was founded when the Town of Georgina was formed from North Gwillimbury Township, the Village of Sutton, and Township of Georgina in 1986.

It has three community-based branches that serve the information, entertainment, and learning needs of clients through children, teens, young adults, and adult programs, services, and collections. The branches share staff, collections, resources, and policies and work collaboratively to meet the needs of all communities within the town including Baldwin, Jackson's Point, Port Bolster, Sibbald Point, Virginia and Udora

History

Georgina Public Library evolved out of individual community libraries. Keswick's first public library was founded in the 1960s, and housed in the Optimist International Hall before being moved to a former post office building beside the fire fighters and police stations. Doris Brown was the first librarian and she led the library from its inception until her retirement in 1978. Branches in Sutton and Pefferlaw served community needs but outgrew their physical space and the Town opened a new Pefferlaw Branch in 1989. In 1996, the Sutton branch was incorporated into a new shared facility with York Region's public and separate school boards on Black River Road. Keswick's branch moved to a shared facility in the Georgina Ice Palace on Wexford Drive and Woodbine Avenue in 2002. The library is a member of the Ontario Library Consortium.

Services

The library is growing to meet the demands of a developing community as Georgina becomes increasingly part of the expansive Greater Toronto Area. Recent changes include a revamped children's area in Keswick, laptop stations in both Keswick and Sutton, and countless aesthetic changes. Various programs are hosted by Georgina Public Library for everyone from babies to adults. These range from Reading Circle and Tween Team in Keswick, to Sewing and Yoga in Sutton. As well, there are several annual programs held by the Children's and Youth Services around Halloween and Christmas. The branches offer free Wi-Fi and computer access, as well as computer literacy courses. The material collection includes fiction and non-fiction books for kids, teens, and adults, DVD's, audiobooks, e-books, magazines, newspapers, and video games. Patrons may also order interlibrary loans as well as enjoy reciprocal loan privileges with neighbouring library systems.

Photo gallery

See also
Ontario Public Libraries

References

External links

Enterprise Library Catalogue 
Ontario Public Libraries

Public libraries in Ontario
Georgina, Ontario
Buildings and structures in the Regional Municipality of York
Education in the Regional Municipality of York
1986 establishments in Ontario
Libraries established in 1986